Ismael Grasa (born 1968) is a Spanish writer. He was born in Huesca, and studied philosophy in Pamplona and Madrid. He has published in a variety of genres, spanning both fiction and non-fiction. He spent some time teaching Spanish in China, which became the basis for his novel Días en China. He has also appeared as an actor in several films by David Trueba. 

Grasa lives and works in Zaragoza.

Selected works
 La esforzada disciplina del aristócrata, winner of the Premio Félix Urabayen de Novela Corta
 De Madrid al cielo, winner of the Premio Tigre Juan,  and nominated for the Premio Herralde
 Trescientos días de sol (short stories, Xordica, 2007), winner of the Premio Ojo Crítico
 Sicilia (travel, El Cobre, 2000)

References

Spanish male writers
1968 births
Living people